Liberty magazine may refer to: 

 Liberty (1881–1908), a political magazine published from 1881 to 1908 by Benjamin Tucker
 Liberty (general interest magazine), published from 1924 to 1950
 Liberty (libertarian magazine), published from 1987 to 2010, transitioned to online-only starting in 2011
 Liberty (Adventist magazine), a religious liberty magazine published by the Seventh-day Adventist Church

See also
 Liberty (disambiguation)